Pieter Christiaan "PC" Beneke (born 18 July 1990) is a South African athlete specialising in the 400 metres hurdles. He represented his country at the 2013 World Championships without reaching the semifinals.

His personal best in the event is 49.18 seconds set in Stellenbosch in 2013.

He is married to a South African long jumper, Lynique Prinsloo.

International competitions

References

1990 births
Living people
South African male hurdlers
World Athletics Championships athletes for South Africa
Medalists at the 2011 Summer Universiade
Medalists at the 2013 Summer Universiade
Universiade medalists in athletics (track and field)
Universiade bronze medalists for South Africa